Nola ovilla, known generally as the woolly nola moth or sharp-blotched nola moth, is a species of nolid moth in the family Nolidae. It is found in North America.

The MONA or Hodges number for Nola ovilla is 8995.

References

Further reading

 
 
 

ovilla
Articles created by Qbugbot
Moths described in 1875